Wild Talents may refer to

 Wild Talents (book), by Charles Fort
 Wild Talents (role-playing game), superhero role-playing game published by Arc Dream Publishing
 Wild Talents, novel by Wilson Tucker